Scott Mercer (born 18 June 1995) is a Scottish professional footballer who plays as a defender for East Fife (second spell) and has also previously played for Dunfermline Athletic, Albion Rovers (loan spell), East Fife (first spell), Queen of the South and Falkirk.

Career
Born in Kirkcaldy, Mercer began his career with Dunfermline Athletic in 2005, progressing through the club's youth set-up. On 8 November 2013, Mercer joined Scottish League Two club Albion Rovers on loan for one month, making his only appearance in a league match versus Berwick Rangers. After the Pars went into administration in 2013, Mercer played once for the club in a Scottish League One match versus Rangers, coming on as an 82nd minute substitute for Craig Dargo. Mercer did not feature for the club at all during the 2014–15 season and following the arrival of new manager Allan Johnston, Mercer was released by the club, along with seventeen other players.

After departing the Pars, Mercer signed for East Fife in July 2015. Mercer's first start for the club was in the Scottish Challenge Cup against Falkirk with his first league start versus East Stirlingshire. In his first season, Mercer was ever-present in the Methil club's defence, playing a total of 41 matches and scoring one goal versus Montrose. This helped the club win automatic promotion to Scottish League One.

Mercer's second season with the club started brightly, with the defender assisting the club in their quest to consolidate their position in the third tier of Scottish football. Mercer's impressive performances in Fife alerted the attention of newly appointed Queens manager Gary Naysmith, who Mercer previously worked under in Methil. On 12 January 2017, Mercer signed for Queen of the South in the Scottish Championship for an undisclosed fee.

On 28 April 2018, Mercer extended his contract to remain with the Doonhamers until the end of the 2018-19 season. On the same day, Mercer sustained a broken foot after 16 minutes of Queens final league match of the 2017-18 season at Glebe Park versus Brechin City. On 24 November 2018, Mercer scored his first goal for Queens, scoring the final goal versus Formartine United at Palmerston in the third round of the Scottish Cup in a 4–1 win. On 11 June 2019, Mercer extended his contract to remain with Queens until the end of the 2019-20 season.

On 24 July 2020, Mercer signed a one-year deal with Falkirk. He returned to East Fife during the 2021 close season.

Career statistics

References

External links

1995 births
Living people
Scottish footballers
Association football defenders
Dunfermline Athletic F.C. players
Albion Rovers F.C. players
East Fife F.C. players
Queen of the South F.C. players
Scottish Professional Football League players
Falkirk F.C. players
Footballers from Kirkcaldy